Charles Lewis  (14 April 1828 – 26 March 1913) was a South African ship chandler, public official and twice Mayor of Cape Town.

Biography
Lewis was born in Milford Haven, Wales and at the age of 15 left home and started a life at sea. His activities in the following years are unclear, but he arrived in Cape Town in 1850. With his experience at sea, he established a successful sail-making business that operated from Bree Street in Cape Town.

Lewis had an interest in local government and in 1876 became mayor of Cape Town. He served his first term from 1876 to 1878. For several years he also represented the Namaqualand region in the old Cape Parliament. He served a second term as mayor from 1883 to 1884 and during this time was given the nickname, 'The Cleaner', for his efforts to make Cape Town cleaner.

Lewis was married three times. His son, Alfred Joseph Smith Lewis, a minister by profession, was also mayor of Cape Town from 1929 to 1931.

References 

1828 births
1913 deaths
Mayors of Cape Town
19th-century South African people